The Invitation is the first major label album by English alternative rock band Thirteen Senses. Released on 27 September 2004 by Vertigo Records, it includes the singles "Do No Wrong", "Into the Fire", "Thru the Glass" and "The Salt Wound Routine". "Into the Fire" was used on trailer for the second season of the American TV show Rescue Me and in the pilot episode of Grey's Anatomy, in the closing sequence of the two-part season three premiere of The 4400, in an episode of Pretty Little Liars, a clip show for Jim Carrey at the MTV Movie Awards 2006, and on BBC One's Match of the Day.

Track listing
"Into the Fire" – 3:38
"Thru the Glass" – 4:37
"Gone" – 3:22
"Do No Wrong" – 4:52
"The Salt Wound Routine" – 4:38
"Saving" / "The Invitation" (Hidden Track) – 6:09
"Lead Us" – 4:46
"Last Forever" – 3:54
"History" – 3:51
"Undivided" – 2:44
"Angels and Spies" – 5:13 1
"Automatic" – 5:03

1 Not present on all versions.

Bonus one-sided 7" vinyl
"Perfect" – 4:25 2

2 With the vinyl release of the album only. The song is also available as a digital download on iTunes UK.

Japanese edition
This has the same tracks as the regular edition plus the following bonus material:

"No Other Life is Attractive" – 5:45
"Falling to the Ground" – 4:16
"Do No Wrong" - video
"Into the Fire" - video
"Thru the Glass" - video (alternative 2005 version)
"The Salt Wound Routine" - video

2004 debut albums
Thirteen Senses albums
Mercury Records albums
Vertigo Records albums
Albums produced by Danton Supple